Left may refer to:

Music
 Left (Hope of the States album), 2006
 Left (Monkey House album), 2016
 "Left", a song by Nickelback from the album Curb, 1996

Direction
 Left (direction), the relative direction opposite of right
 Left-handedness

Politics
 Left (Austria), a movement of Marxist–Leninist, Maoist and Trotskyist organisations in Austria
 Left-wing politics (also known as left or leftism), a political trend or ideology
 Centre-left politics
 Far-left politics
 The Left (Germany)

See also
 Copyleft
 Leaving (disambiguation)
 Lefty (disambiguation)
 Sinister (disambiguation)
 Venstre (disambiguation)
 Right (disambiguation)